An audio format is a medium for sound recording and reproduction. The term is applied to both the physical recording media and the recording formats of the audio content—in computer science it is often limited to the audio file format, but its wider use usually refers to the physical method used to store the data.

Music is recorded and distributed using a variety of audio formats, some of which store additional information.

Timeline of audio format developments

See also 
 Timeline of video formats
 Format war
 Audio data compression

References

External links 
 History of Recording Technologies
 Museum Of Obsolete Media – Audio Formats

 
 
Technology timelines
audio
Obsolete technologies